Chatfield Township may refer to the following townships in the United States:

 Chatfield Township, Fillmore County, Minnesota
 Chatfield Township, Crawford County, Ohio